Carl Friedman, pseudonym of Carolina Klop (29 April 1952 – 27 March 2020) was a Dutch author.

Biography
Friedman grew up in Eindhoven, in a Catholic family. She became interested in World War II from a young age. She began collecting war documents at 15. Her interest may have been driven by the fact that her father was a resistance fighter and interned at Sachsenhausen concentration camp prior to liberation.

After her secondary studies, Friedman began working as a translator and interpreter. She moved to Breda, and worked at a daily newspaper called De Stem. She began her writing career in 1991 with the novel Nightfather, which became a success and was adapted for television in 1995. It has been translated into many languages.

Books
Nightfather (1991)
The Shovel and the Loom (1993) 
 Of this book was made the film: Left Luggage directed by Jeroen Krabbé.
The Gray Lover (2003)
Wie heeft de meeste joden (2004)

References

1952 births
2020 deaths
Dutch women writers
People from Eindhoven
Dutch columnists
Pseudonymous writers
Pseudonymous women writers
20th-century Dutch women
20th-century pseudonymous writers
21st-century pseudonymous writers